The eighth season of the American television series Bones premiered on September 17, 2012, and concluded on April 29, 2013, on Fox. The show maintained its previous time slot, airing on Mondays at 8:00 pm ET, and consists of 24 episodes.

Cast and characters

Main cast 
 Emily Deschanel as Dr. Temperance "Bones" Brennan, a forensic anthropologist 
 David Boreanaz as FBI Special Agent Seeley Booth, who is the official FBI liaison with the Jeffersonian 
 Michaela Conlin as Angela Montenegro, a forensic artist and wife of Jack Hodgins
 Tamara Taylor as Dr. Camille Saroyan, a forensic pathologist and the head of the forensic division
 T. J. Thyne as Dr. Jack Hodgins, an entomologist, mineralogist, palynologist, and forensic chemist, and husband of Angela Montenegro
 John Francis Daley as Dr. Lance Sweets, an FBI psychologist who provides psychological reports on criminals and staff including Brennan and Booth

Recurring cast 
 Patricia Belcher as Caroline Julian, a prosecutor that often works with the team
 Andrew Leeds as Christopher Pelant, a hacker who was previously under house arrest and framed Brennan for murder; he is currently a fugitive wanted by the FBI
 Reed Diamond as Hayes Flynn, an FBI special agent
 Ryan O'Neal as Max Keenan, Brennan's father
 Danielle Panabaker as Olivia Sparling, a rookie FBI special agent
 Joanna Cassidy as Marianne Booth, Seeley's mother
 Tiffany Hines as Michelle Welton, Cam's adopted daughter
 Cyndi Lauper as Avalon Harmonia, a psychic
 Scott Lowell as Dr. Douglas Filmore, a Canadian podiatrist
 Danny Woodburn as Alex Radziwill, a Diplomatic immunity and State Department official

Interns
 Eugene Byrd as Dr. Clark Edison
 Luke Kleintank as Finn Abernathy
 Michael Grant Terry as Wendell Bray
 Pej Vahdat as Arastoo Vaziri
 Carla Gallo as Daisy Wick
 Joel David Moore as Colin Fisher
 Brian Klugman as Dr. Oliver Wells

Production 
The series was renewed for an eighth season on March 29, 2012. Executive producer Stephen Nathan commented that season eight would include storylines that were originally intended for the previous season but could not be used then due to its reduced episode count. Twenty-two episodes were produced during season eight, with the extra four episodes ordered by Fox for the previous season incorporated into season eight, making a total of 26 episodes. In March 2013, it was reported that only 24 of the 26 episodes would air in season eight, as the two other episodes would be filmed after the season eight finale, and would be aired during the beginning of the ninth season. Series creator Hart Hanson believes the show could last another two seasons (seasons 9 and 10), saying "we're very, very confident in having at least a season 9, and I can see as far as season 10 before my eyes get misty."

Episodes

DVD and Blu-ray release 
The eighth season of Bones was released on DVD and Blu-ray (subtitled "Once Upon a Crime Edition") in region 1 on October 8, 2013, in region 2 on September 30, 2013, and in region 4 on November 20, 2013. The set includes all 24 episodes of season eight on a 6-disc DVD set and 5-disc Blu-ray set presented in anamorphic widescreen. Special features include an audio commentary on "The Future in the Past" by Hart Hanson, Stephen Nathan and Ian Toynton, deleted scenes from "The Patriot in Purgatory", "The Survivor in the Soap" and "The Party in the Pants", a gag reel, and two featurettes—Dying to Know: Bones Answers Your Questions! and Bare Bones: Total Fandom-onium.

References 

General references

External links 
 
 

Season 08
2012 American television seasons
2013 American television seasons